Vairimorpha is a genus of microsporidian parasites.

Species include:

 Vairimorpha apis - a parasite of the honey bee,
 Vairimorpha ceranae - a parasite of the honey bee,
 Vairimorpha cheracis - a parasite of the Australian freshwater crayfish, Cherax destructor
 Vairimorpha disparis - a parasite of the moth, Lymantria dispar
 Vairimorpha ephestiae - a parasite of the wax moth, Galleria mellonella
 Vairimorpha hybomitrae - a parasite of gadflies of the genus Hybomitra
 Vairimorpha invictae - a parasite of the fire ant, Solenopsis invicta
 Vairimorpha lymantriae - a parasite of the gypsy moth, Lymantria dispar
 Vairimorpha necatrix - a parasite of several moth species
 Vairimorpha plodiae

References 

Microsporidia genera
Parasites of arthropods